Theodore Burr (August 16, 1771 – November 22, 1822) was an inventor from Torrington, Connecticut,  who was credited with the Burr Arch Truss bridge design. He designed and built one of the first bridges across the Hudson River and several bridges that crossed the Susquehanna River.

Patent
Burr was awarded US Patent No. 2769 on April 4, 1817 for his arch and truss bridge design. The "Burr arch truss" used two long arches, resting on the abutments on either end, that typically sandwiched a multiple kingpost structure. Theodore Burr built nearly every bridge that crossed the Susquehanna River from Binghamton, New York, to Maryland in the early 19th century. His successes made him the most distinguished architect of bridges in the country.

Professional life
Theodore Burr came to Oxford, New York in 1792. By 1794, he had built a grist mill (once owned by Fletcher & Corbin), and a dam to power the mill. In 1800, he built the first stringer bridge across the Chenango River in Oxford.

Around 1804, Burr built the first "sizable bridge" crossing New York's Hudson River, at Waterford, New York. It stood for over a century until it was destroyed by fire in 1909.

From 1809-1811, he built an impressive Federal style house for his family at 8 Fort Hill Park in Oxford. Wings were added to both sides of the house at a later and unknown date. The building still stands and houses the Oxford Memorial Library.

Between 1811 and 1818, Burr designed, then constructed or supervised five crossings of the Susquehanna River.  The first four were in Pennsylvania at Nescopeck Falls (Berwick), Columbia, Harrisburg, and Northumberland.  The last was the  Susquehanna River Bridge near Port Deposit, Maryland.

Personal life 
In 1789, Burr married Asenath Cook in Hartford, Connecticut. On April 13, 1794, they had a daughter named Philomela Burr.

He was a cousin of Vice President Aaron Burr.

See also
Burr Truss

References

External links
 Direct link to US Patent No. 2769 image

American civil engineers
19th-century American inventors
1771 births
1822 deaths
American people of English descent
Theodore
People from Oxford, New York